The Luxembourg national ice hockey team is the national men's ice hockey team of Luxembourg. It is controlled by the Luxembourg Ice Hockey Federation and a member of the International Ice Hockey Federation. Luxembourg is currently ranked 43rd in the IIHF World Rankings and competes at Division II of the IIHF World Championships. They won their first tournament in 2017 at the Division III level.

History
Luxembourg joined the International Ice Hockey Federation (IIHF) in 1912, though did not participate in the World Championship until 1992, when they placed fifth in Group C2, the lowest tier. They would not return to the tournament until 2000, though except for 2001 have been a regular participant since then.

The team plays in the colours of the national flag: red, white, and light blue. The squad is coached by Petr Fical of Germany and captained by Ronny Scheier. Monique Scheier-Schneider served as the team's general manager from the 2005 to 2007 world championships.

In the 2007 World Championships, Luxembourg finished third in Division III, narrowly missing out on promotion to Division II after being defeated 4–3 by hosts Ireland in overtime. Luxembourg has never competed in ice hockey at the Olympics. They placed third at the 2009 IIHF World Championship Division III in Dunedin, New Zealand. They won their first tournament in 2017 at the Division III level.

IIHF World Championships

References

External links

IIHF profile
National Teams of Ice Hockey

 
Ice hockey teams in Luxembourg
National ice hockey teams in Europe